Bela gervillei is an extinct species of sea snail, a marine gastropod mollusk in the family Mangeliidae.

Description
The length of the shell attains 5 mm, its diameter 2 mm.

Distribution
This extinct marine species was found in Eocene strata in Normandy, France.

References

External links
  Fossilshells : Image of Bela gervillei

gervillei